

Democratic Republic of Congo
 Chadrac Akolo – Amiens – 2019–20
 Cédric Bakambu – Sochaux, Marseille – 2010–14, 2021–22
 Cédric Baseya – Lille – 2008–09
 Nill De Pauw – Guingamp – 2015–17
 Lyambo Etshele – Lille OSC, Le Havre – 1994–96
 Roger Hitoto – Lille OSC – 1994–97
 Jordan Ikoko – Guingamp – 2016–19
 Hérita Ilunga – Saint-Étienne, Toulouse FC, Rennes – 2004–09, 2012–13
 Giannelli Imbula – Marseille, Toulouse FC – 2013–15, 2017–18
 Eugène Kabongo – Lyon – 1989–90
 Gaël Kakuta – Dijon, Amiens, Lens – 2011–12, 2017–18, 2019–22
 Gédéon Kalulu – Lorient – 2022–
 Jean-Paul Kamudimba – Nice – 2003–04
 Jirès Kembo Ekoko – Rennes – 2006–12
 Chiguy Lucau – Paris SG, Le Mans – 2002–03, 2005–07
 Maboula Lukunku – Lille OSC – 2003–04
 Arnaud Lusamba – Nice – 2016–20
 Larrys Mabiala – Paris SG, Nice – 2007–12
 Mekindu Makengo – Lens – 1984–87
 Harrison Manzala – Amiens, Angers – 2017–20
 Arthur Masuaku – Valenciennes – 2013–14
 Alain Masudi – Saint-Étienne – 1999–2000
 Franck Matingou – Bastia – 1998–2005
 Chris Mavinga – Rennes, Reims, Troyes – 2011–13, 2014–16
 Jason Mayélé – Châteauroux – 1997–98
 Chancel Mbemba – Marseille – 2022–
 Dieumerci Mbokani – Monaco – 2010–11
 Omenuke Mfulu – Reims – 2014–16
 Gaston Mobati – Lille – 1986–90
 Benjamin Mokulu – Bastia – 2014–15
 Cédric Mongongu – Monaco, Evian, Montpellier  – 2007–15, 2016–17
 Samuel Moutoussamy – Nantes – 2017–
 Rémi Mulumba – Lorient – 2010–13, 2015–16
 Youssuf Mulumbu – Paris SG – 2006–08
 Jean-Santos Muntubila – Sochaux – 1982–84
 Ngonda Muzinga – Dijon – 2019–21
 Arnold Mvuemba – Rennes, Lorient, Lyon – 2003–07, 2009–17
 Aristote N'Dongala – Nantes – 2013–15
 Yeni N'Gbakoto – Metz, Guingamp – 2014–15, 2017–19
 Ferris N'Goma – Brest – 2019–20
 Martin N'Kouka – Toulon – 1983–87
 Fabrice N'Sakala – Troyes – 2011–12
 Vital N'Simba – Clermont – 2021–22
 Firmin Ndombe Mubele – Rennes, Toulouse FC – 2016–18
 Jordan Nkololo – Caen – 2015–18
 Shabani Nonda – Rennes, AS Monaco – 1998–2005
 Marlin Piana – Troyes – 2001–02
 Joël Sami – Nancy – 2008–13
 Marcel Tisserand – Monaco, Toulouse – 2013–17
 John Tshibumbu – Gazélec Ajaccio – 2015–16
 Zico Tumba – Metz – 1996–97
 Anthony Walongwa  – FC Nantes – 2015–18
 Yoane Wissa – Angers, Lorient – 2016–17, 2020–21
 Yannick Yenga – Le Mans – 2003–04
 Distel Zola – Nancy – 2011–12

Denmark
 Henrik Agerbeck – Nantes, Sochaux – 1980–85
 Mads Albæk – Reims – 2013–15
 Joachim Andersen – Lyon – 2019–21
 Stephan Andersen – Evian – 2011–13
 Kaj Andrup – Club Français – 1932–33
 Mikkel Beck – Lille – 2000–02
 Niels Bennike – Nancy – 1954–55
 Jens Bertelsen – Rouen – 1984–85
 Martin Braithwaite – Toulouse, Bordeaux – 2013–17, 2018
 Helge Bronée – Nancy – 1948–50
 Andreas Bruus – Troyes – 2022–
 Kenneth Brylle – Marseille – 1985–86
 Søren Busk – AS Monaco – 1986–87
 Kaj Christiansen – Stade Français, Le Havre – 1948–49, 1950–52
 Flemming Christensen – Saint-Étienne – 1982–83
 Denni Conteh – Strasbourg – 1997–99
 Andreas Cornelius – Bordeaux – 2018–19
 Mikkel Desler – Toulouse – 2022–
 Kasper Dolberg – Nice – 2019–
 Riza Durmisi – Nice – 2019–20
 Per Frandsen – Lille – 1990–94
 Peter Frank – Strasbourg – 1998–99
 Jakob Friis-Hansen – Lille, Bordeaux – 1989–96
 Michael Gravgaard – Nantes – 2008–09
 Jesper Hansen – Evian, Bastia – 2013–16
 Kaj Hansen – Stade Français, Colmar, Metz – 1947–50
 Kian Hansen – Nantes – 2014–15
 John Helt – Sochaux – 1986–87
 Niels-Christian Holmstrøm – Bordeaux – 1974–77
 Lars Jacobsen – Guingamp – 2014–16
 Bent Jensen – Bordeaux – 1969–72
 Brian Jensen – Rennes, Cannes – 1994–98
 Erik Kuld Jensen – Lille, Lyon, Troyes, Marseille – 1950–53, 1954–58
 Henning-Ole Jensen – Metz – 1969–72, 1975–76
 Henrik Imre Jensen – Lille – 1989–90
 Per Allex Jensen – Saint-Étienne – 1953–54
 Jesper Juelsgård – Evian – 2014–15
 Thomas Kahlenberg – Auxerre, Evian – 2005–09, 2011–12
 Simon Kjær – Lille – 2013–15
 Søren Larsen – Toulouse FC – 2008–09
 Steen Larsen – Nantes – 1969–70
Lukas Lerager – Bordeaux – 2017–19
 Søren Lerby – AS Monaco – 1986–87
 Jonas Lössl – Guingamp – 2014–16
 Henrik Lykke – Lille – 1994–95
 Emil Lyng – Lille – 2008–09, 2010–11
 Børge Mathiesen – Stade Français, Le Havre – 1947–49, 1951–53
 Allan Michaelsen – Nantes – 1970–72
 Johnny Mølby – Nantes – 1991–92
 Miklos Molnar – Saint-Étienne – 1992–94
 Rasmus Nicolaisen – Toulouse – 2022–
 Benny Nielsen – Saint-Étienne – 1981–82
 Carsten Nielsen – Strasbourg – 1981–85
 Henrik Nielsen – Lille – 1990–92
 Kurt "Nikkelaj" Nielsen – Marseille – 1955–56
 Michael Mio Nielsen – Lille – 1990–92
 Morten Nielsen – Strasbourg, Guingamp – 1998–02
 Nicki Bille Nielsen – Evian – 2014–15
 Svend Nielsen – CO Roubaix-Tourcoing – 1953–55
 Kristen Nygaard – Nîmes Olympique – 1983–84
 Allan Olesen – Saint-Étienne – 2000–01
 Jesper Olsen – Bordeaux, Caen – 1989–92
 Per Pedersen – Strasbourg – 1998–99
 Dan Petersen – AS Monaco, Bastia – 1994–97, 1999–01
 Frank Pingel – Lille – 1994–95
 Christian Poulsen – Evian – 2011–12
 Jakob Poulsen – AS Monaco – 2012–13
 Kasper Schmeichel – Nice – 2022–
 Ronnie Schwartz – Guingamp – 2014–15
 John Sivebæk – Saint-Étienne, AS Monaco – 1987–92
 Tom Søndergaard – Metz – 1970–72
 Arne Sørensen – Stade Français, Nancy – 1947–49
 Erling Sørensen – Strasbourg – 1949
 Jørn Sørensen – Metz – 1961–62
 Anders Sundstrup – Sochaux – 1986–87
 Nicolaj Thomsen – Nantes – 2016–17
 Kim Vilfort – Lille – 1985–86
 Daniel Wass – Evian – 2011–15
 Finn Wiberg – Nancy – 1970–72

Dominican Republic
 Mariano Díaz – Lyon – 2017–18

References and notes

Books

Club pages
AJ Auxerre former players
AJ Auxerre former players
Girondins de Bordeaux former players
Girondins de Bordeaux former players
Les ex-Tangos (joueurs), Stade Lavallois former players
Olympique Lyonnais former players
Olympique de Marseille former players
FC Metz former players
AS Monaco FC former players
Ils ont porté les couleurs de la Paillade... Montpellier HSC Former players
AS Nancy former players
FC Nantes former players
Paris SG former players
Red Star Former players
Red Star former players
Stade de Reims former players
Stade Rennais former players
CO Roubaix-Tourcoing former players
AS Saint-Étienne former players
Sporting Toulon Var former players

Others

stat2foot
footballenfrance
French Clubs' Players in European Cups 1955-1995, RSSSF
Finnish players abroad, RSSSF
Italian players abroad, RSSSF
Romanians who played in foreign championships
Swiss players in France, RSSSF
EURO 2008 CONNECTIONS: FRANCE, Stephen Byrne Bristol Rovers official site

Notes

France
 
Association football player non-biographical articles